Wilhelm Bennet was the Governor of Halland County in Sweden from 1728 to 1737 and the Governor of Malmöhus County from 1737 to 1740.

Biography
Bennet inherited Ellinge Castle in 1724 and made major repairs to the estate.

References

Governors of Halland County
Governors of Malmöhus County
Age of Liberty people
Knights of the Order of Charles XIII
Swedish people of Scottish descent